The 2021–22 season is Orlando Pirates's 26th consecutive season in the South African Premier Division, the top tier of South African soccer. They will also participate in the Nedbank Cup, the MTN 8 and the CAF Confederation Cup.

Review and events
Orlando Pirates F.C. started the 2021–22 Season in the MTN 8 as defending champions but were eliminated by Swallows F.C. in the Quarter-finals. Josef Zinnbauer stepped down 24 hours after the lose as Orlando Pirates F.C. manager.

Players
Statistics correct as of : 17 April 2022

List of squad players, including number of appearances by competition

|}

Preseason friendlies

Orlando Pirates F.C. play Kaizer Chiefs F.C. on a preseason friendly since 2011 except for 2018 (due to FIFA World Cup Qualifications) and 2020 (due to COVID-19 virus). The 2021 Carling Black Label Cup was the ninth edition of the Carling Black Label Cup to be held.

League

DStv Premiership Log

Results by matchday

DStv Premiership
Matchday 1

Matchday 2

Matchday 3

Matchday 4

Matchday 5

Matchday 6

Matchday 7

Matchday 8

Matchday 9

Matchday 10

Matchday 11

Matchday 12

Matchday 13

Matchday 14

Matchday 15

Matchday 16

Matchday 17

Matchday 18

Matchday 19

Matchday 20

Matchday 21

Matchday 22

Matchday 23

Matchday 24

Matchday 25

Matchday 26

Matchday 27

Matchday 28

Matchday 29

Matchday 30

Competitions

MTN 8 Cup

Quarter-finals

Orlando Pirates F.C. title defence came to an end after the defeat.

Nedbank Cup

Last 32 (second round)

Last 16 (third round)

Orlando Pirates F.C. Cup Journey Ended Here

International competitions

CAF Confederation Cup

Second round

Orlando Pirates Win By 1–0 On Aggregate

Play Off Round

Orlando Pirates F.C. progress to the Group Stage following a forfeit by LPRC Oilers

Group B

Knockout stage
Quarter-finals

1st Leg
2nd Leg
1–1 on aggregate. Orlando Pirates won 4–3 on penalties.

Semi-finals

1st Leg

2nd Leg

Notes

References

Sources
Pirates Begin Title Defence Against Oldest Rivals
Bucs Crash Out of MTN8

South Africa - Orlando Pirates FC - Results, fixtures, squad, statistics, photos, videos and news - Soccerway
Zinnbauer: German resigns as Orlando Pirates coach after Moroka Swallows loss Goal.com
2021/22 Caf CC: Two preliminary round fixtures confirmed
The team | Orlando Pirates Football Club Squad | List of Players
Draw reveals schedule of the TotalEnergies Confederation Cup preliminaries | Total CAF Confederation Cup

External links
 

Orlando Pirates F.C.
2021 in South African sport
2022 in South African sport